Dolors Monserdà i Vidal (née, Dolors Moncerdà i Vidal; also known as, Dolors Monserdà de Macià; Barcelona, 1845 - 1919) was a Catalan writer, poet, storyteller, playwright, essayist, and columnist. She was the sister of the painter Enric Monserdà i Vidal (1850-1926), and her daughter was married to the modernist architect, Josep Puig i Cadafalch. 

She wrote in Spanish through 1875, and from then on, in the Catalan language. She was a regular participant in the Floral Games, where she was awarded prizes in 1878, 1882 and 1891. In 1909, she was the first woman to chair a poetry contest. A journalist as well, she wrote for the periodical, La Renaixença, and the magazine, Feminal.

Selected works

Poetry 
 Poesies Catalanes, 1888
 Poesies, 1911
 Poetry from the Floral Games
 Qui ets?, (1916, 1917)
 He fet bé! (Propòsits d'enamorats), (1916, 1917)
 Adéu a la poesia, (1916, 1919)
 Flors de Natzareth, (1916, 1917, 1919)
 Rondalles i Cançons, (1916, 1919, 1920, 1924)
 El verb de la Patria, (1917)
 La nostra Universitat, (1917, 1919)
 A la poesia, (1917, 1920)
 Del meu dietari d'Anyorançes, (1919)

Novels 
 La Montserrat, 1893
 La família Asparó, 1900
 La fabricanta, 1904
 La Quitèria, 1906
 Del món, 1908
 Maria-Glòria, 1917
 Buscant una ànima, 1919

Theatre 
 Sembrad y cogeréis, 1874
 Teresa o un jorn de prova, 1876
 Amor mana, 1913

Literary critic 
 Estudi feminista, 1909
 Biografía de Na Josepa Massanés i Dalmau, 1915
 Tasques socials, 1916

References

External links

1845 births
1919 deaths
Writers from Barcelona
Women writers from Catalonia
Poets from Catalonia
Storytellers
Women storytellers
Spanish essayists
Journalists from Catalonia
Women dramatists and playwrights
Catalan dramatists and playwrights
Catalan-language writers
Spanish women essayists
Spanish women poets